Michael Doherty  is professor of law at Lancaster University. He is a former chairman of the Association of Law Teachers, and a Senior Fellow of the Higher Education Academy.

Selected publications
 Public Law. 2nd edition, Routledge, 2018.

References

External links 
https://www.researchgate.net/profile/Michael_Doherty8

Living people
Year of birth missing (living people)
Academics of Lancaster University
British legal scholars
Senior Fellows of the Higher Education Academy